The Navajo are a Native American people of the Southwestern United States.

Navajo or Navaho may also refer to:

 Navajo Nation, the governmental entity of the Navajo people
 Navajo language, spoken in the Southwestern United States

Places in the United States
 Navajo, New Mexico
 Navajo, San Diego
 Navajo City, New Mexico
 Navajo County, Arizona
 Navajo Generating Station, a coal-fired powerplant
 Navajo Reservoir

Others
 Navajo (film), a 1952 documentary film
 Navajo (train), one of the named passenger trains of the Atchison, Topeka and Santa Fe Railway
 The Navajo (sleeper car), a sleeping car on the Super Chief passenger train
 Alfa Romeo Navajo concept car
 Mazda Navajo, a rebadged version of the Ford Explorer, introduced in 1991
 Navajo Sandstone, a geologic formation in the Glen Canyon Group
 Navajo-Churro sheep, a breed of sheep
 Piper PA-31 Navajo, a light, twin engine airplane
 SM-64 Navaho, an experimental cruise missile
 USS Navajo, the name of more than one United States Navy ship
 "Navajo", a 1903 piece of popular music by Egbert Van Alstyne
 The Navajos, a subgroup of the anti-Nazi Edelweiss Pirates